Indira Gandhi Rashtriya Uran Akademi (IGRUA) is a public pilot training institute located at Fursatganj Airfield in Uttar Pradesh, India. It was established in 1985. It is an autonomous institution and comes under the Ministry of Civil Aviation, Government of India. In August 2013, the Ministry of Civil Aviation announced that a National Aviation University would be established on the IGRUA site.

Courses offered
The institution conducts flying training leading to the award of commercial pilot license (CPL). IGRUA also  offers ancillary courses such as Multi Crew Coordination( MCC) and crew resource management (CRM). IGRUA is also one of the approved institutes to carry out Certified Flying Instructors Refresher (CFI Refresher) Course by MOCA, Govt of India.

Campus location 
The Akademi is about 15 km from Raebareli on Raebareli-Sultanpur National Highway. It is  about 100 km from Lucknow which is the capital of Uttar Pradesh state of India. The Akademi is well connected by Road and Rail. The nearest civil airport is at Lucknow Airport and Main Railway station is Raebareli Junction. IGRUA has opened a new base at Kalaburagi Airport, Karnataka on 19 January 2021.

List of Notifiable Accidents
The following incidents involving IGRUA Planes have occurred

See also
 List of pilot training institutes in India

References

External links
 Official website

Raebareli district
Aviation schools in India
1985 establishments in Uttar Pradesh
Educational institutions established in 1985
Monuments and memorials to Indira Gandhi
Ministry of Civil Aviation (India)